Frank Pastor (born 7 December 1957) is a German former professional footballer who played as a strikerfor Hallescher FC Chemie and BFC Dynamo. He won several titles with BFC Dynamo and became th league top goal scorer in 1986–87 season. Pastor made seven appearances for the East Germany national team, but was unable to record a goal at international level. Pastor was transferred to BSG Aktivist Schwarze Pumpe at the start of the 1989–90 season. He moved to Malaysia after German reunification. Pastor then went to play in Austria in 1991, before he returned to Hallescher FC in 1994.

Honours
BFC Dynamo
DDR-Oberliga: 1985, 1986, 1987, 1988
FDGB Pokal: 1988, 1989

Individual
DDR-Oberliga top scorer 1986-87

References

External links
Career history

1957 births
Living people
German footballers
East German footballers
Association football forwards
East Germany international footballers
Hallescher FC players
Berliner FC Dynamo players
Terengganu FC players
SV Germania Schöneiche players
DDR-Oberliga players
German expatriate footballers
German expatriate sportspeople in Malaysia
Expatriate footballers in Malaysia
Sportspeople from Halle (Saale)
People from Bezirk Halle
Footballers from Saxony-Anhalt
20th-century German people
German expatriate sportspeople in Austria
Expatriate footballers in Austria